Tracy Lindsey Melchior (born June 22, 1970) is an author and actress most known for playing the role of Kristen Forrester Dominguez on the CBS daytime drama The Bold and the Beautiful and Beverly Hills Cop III.

Acting
Melchior was cast as the original Veronica Landers on The Young and the Restless from 1996 to 1997. In 1994, Melchior had a small role in Beverly Hills Cop III as the ticket booth lady who gives a ticket to Axel Foley (Eddie Murphy). In 1999, Melchior also had a main role in Sunset Beach as Tess Marin during March–December 1999. She was hired to play the role of Kristen Forrester on a contract basis from 2001 to 2003 and returned in several reprisal appearances between 2004 and 2017. In the fall of 2003 she briefly played the role of Kelly Cramer in the ABC daytime drama One Life to Live.

Writing
Melchior's 2005 memoir Breaking the Perfect 10 details her acting career and effort to find salvation in Hollywood's male-dominated industry where malevolent and sexist behavior prevailed.

In an appearance on Larry King Live in 2005, the actress discussed her book, drawing attention to the often pernicious casting culture.

In 2017, following the launch of the #MeToo movement, the actress was invited to appear on a special episode of Hannity, where she recounted the experiences she wrote about in her book.

Producer
Presented with opportunities to work behind-the-camera and advance social causes and community responsibility (including civil obedience initiatives), the actress launched a film company to inspire others to fostering social change.

Personal life
Melchior and her husband, LAPD officer Rob Melchior, have two sons. The avid equestrian is an animal welfare advocate and a social justice activist. Her activism inspired her interest in pursuing film production.

References

External links
 
 

American soap opera actresses
Living people
1973 births
21st-century American women